Kilmory Castle, also known as Kilmory House, is a large 19th century house located just to the south of Lochgilphead, in old county Argyll, on the west coast of Scotland. It is currently occupied by the headquarters of the Argyll and Bute Council. The gardens are open to the public and form part of a country park on the former estate. The house is protected as a category B listed building.

History
A house may have stood on the site as early as the 14th century. There was a church at Kilmory in ancient times, and in the 1550s the church and lands of Kilmory were held by the Abbot of Paisley. In 1575 the estate was owned by Donald Campbell of Kilmory, and remained in the Campbell family for over 250 years. The Campbells built a house, or extended the existing one, between 1816 and 1820.

Eliza Campbell, the eldest daughter and co-heir of Peter Campbell, married Sir John Orde, 2nd Baronet in 1826. He purchased the estates following the death of his father-in-law in 1828 and of his wife in 1829. Orde demolished the modest old Campbell house and replaced it with a grand Gothic-revival mansion designed by architect Joseph Gordon Davis and completed in c. 1830. The core of the older house was retained, but was extended into an ‘L’-shaped plan, with new exterior and interior decoration, and a large octagonal tower at the south-west corner. Orde also greatly expanded and improved the grounds and estate, engaging William Hooker to extend the gardens in 1830. Further extensions were carried out to the rear in 1863.

Orde was buried in the private burial ground adjacent to the house in 1878. His son succeeded to the baronetcy, and changed his name to Campbell-Orde in 1880. The Campbell-Orde baronets retained the estate until 1938.

In March 1949 an announcement was made that it would open in June as a national holiday centre for young people.

In July 1971 it was designated a category B listed building.

In 1974, Argyll County Council purchased the house to serve as a headquarters for Argyll and Bute District Council, which was formed in 1975. In 1995 local government was reorganised again, although Kilmory remained in use as the headquarters of the new Argyll and Bute unitary authority. An office block extension was built onto the house between 1980 and 1982, to increase the provision of space. Repairs had to carried out following a fire which damaged the west wing in 1984.

References

External links
 
 

Castles in Argyll and Bute
Category B listed buildings in Argyll and Bute
Country houses in Argyll and Bute
Lochgilphead